Visky or Víshal may refer to:

Vísky (Blansko District), a village and municipality in the Czech Republic
Vísky (Rokycany District), a village and municipality in the Czech Republic

People with the surname
András Visky (born 1957), Romanian poet and playwright